The Sonalika Group is an Indian multinational company headquartered in Hoshiarpur, Punjab and is active mainly in the automobile sector. It is best known for Sonalika Tractors. The Sonalika Group is headed by Lakshman Das Mittal.

 International Tractors Limited is the major company, involved in manufacturing and exporting tractors, farm equipment and accessories.
 International Cars And Motors Ltd. (ICML) manufactures MUVs, and was established in 2004 with the capacity to manufacture 2,000 vehicles in a month.
Sonalika produces tractors with two brands Sonalika & Solis.
They produce tractors from 20 HP to 120HP range.

References

Car manufacturers of India
Companies based in Punjab, India
Vehicle manufacturing companies established in 1969
1969 establishments in Punjab, India
Indian companies established in 1969
Companies of India